Cəlal Hakim oğlu Hüseynov (born on 2 January 2003) is an Azerbaijani footballer who plays as a defender for Shamakhi, on loan from Başakşehir in the Azerbaijan Premier League.

Club career
Hüseynov made his debut in the Azerbaijan Premier League for Zira on 25 October 2020, match against Qarabağ.

International career
He made his debut for Azerbaijan national football team on 14 November 2021 in a friendly against Qatar.

References

External links
 

2003 births
Living people
Association football defenders
Azerbaijani footballers
Azerbaijan youth international footballers
Azerbaijan under-21 international footballers
Azerbaijan international footballers
Azerbaijan Premier League players
Zira FK players
Shamakhi FK players